Stephen Crosby (1808–1869) was an American politician. He served as the commissioner of the General Land Office for Texas in the 1850s and 1860s. He is the namesake of Crosby County, Texas.

Early life
Stephen Crosby was born in 1808 in South Carolina.

Career
Crosby worked on a steamboat on the Alabama River in the 1830s. He moved to Texas in 1840 and joined the Democratic Party.

In 1851, he was elected as a commissioner of the General Land Office for Texas. He served in this capacity until 1858. He ran again as a member of the Know Nothing Party, but he lost the election. Nevertheless, he served again as Commissioner as a Democrat until he was dismissed in 1867.

Personal life
Crosby married Eliza Green. They had a son, Charles Adolphus Crosby. They resided in Austin, Texas.

Death
Crosby died of laudanum overdose on August 5, 1869 in Austin, Texas. Crosby County, Texas was named in his honor.

References

External links
Crosby, Stephen 1808-1869 on WorldCat

1808 births
1869 deaths
People from South Carolina
People from Crosby County, Texas
People from Austin, Texas
General Land Office Commissioners
Texas Democrats
Texas Know Nothings